Anabacerthia is a genus of birds in the ovenbird family Furnariidae.

Within the ovenbird family the members of this genus are most closely related to the foliage-gleaners in the genus Syndactyla.

The genus contains the following five species:
 White-browed foliage-gleaner, Anabacerthia amaurotis
 Scaly-throated foliage-gleaner, Anabacerthia variegaticeps
 Montane foliage-gleaner, Anabacerthia striaticollis
 Rufous-tailed foliage-gleaner, Anabacerthia ruficaudata
 Ochre-breasted foliage-gleaner, Anabacerthia lichtensteini

References 

 
Bird genera
Taxonomy articles created by Polbot
Taxa named by Frédéric de Lafresnaye